Kalikapur is a census town in Pashchimi Singhbhum district in the Indian state of Jharkhand.

Geography
It has an average elevation of 158 metres (518 feet).

Demographics
 India census, Kalikapur had a population of 3,786. Males constitute 52% of the population and females 48%. Kalikapur has an average literacy rate of 90%, higher than the national average of 59.5%: male literacy is 93%, and female literacy is 87%. In Kalikapur, 6% of the population is under 6 years of age.

References

Cities and towns in West Singhbhum district